The Mir of Shighnan was the ruler of Shighnan, a region that occasionally was politically independent and at other times was subservient to Badakhshan, the Khanate of Kokand, and Afghanistan. The seat of power of the Mir of Shighnan was at Qaleh Barpanjeh (قلعه برپنجه). In 1883 the last Mir of Shighnan, Yusuf Ali Khan, was ousted from power by the Afghan government and Shighnan became the Shighnan District in the Afghan Province of Badakhshan. In the 1890s Afghanistan transferred control of half of Shighnan to Russia. This area became the Shughnon District and today is a district in Gorno-Badakhshan Autonomous Province in Tajikistan.

Shah Mir - Lived in the 18th century.
Shah Wanji – Ruled in the late 18th century. Son of Shah Mir. The name Wanji is derived from the fact that his mother was from Vanj. Ney Elias reported seeing a marker stone dating from 1786 commemorating a canal built by Shah Wanji.
Kuliad Khan – no dates – Son of Wanji.
Abdur Rahim – grandson of Shah Wanji.
Yusuf Ali Khan – Son of Abdur Rahim. He was dethroned by the Afghan military in 1883 and imprisoned in Kabul.

See also
List of mirs of Badakhshan

References

History of Tajikistan
18th century in Afghanistan
19th century in Afghanistan